
Gmina Dobromierz is a rural gmina (administrative district) in Świdnica County, Lower Silesian Voivodeship, in south-western Poland.

Neighbouring gminas
Gmina Dobromierz is bordered by the town of Świebodzice and the gminas of Bolków, Mściwojów, Paszowice, Stare Bogaczowice and Strzegom.

Villages
The gmina contains the villages of Borów, Bronów, Czernica, Dobromierz, Dzierzków, Gniewków, Jaskulin, Jugowa, Kłaczyna, Pietrzyków, Roztoka and Szymanów.

References

Dobromierz
Świdnica County